Homoeocera lophocera is a moth of the subfamily Arctiinae first described by Herbert Druce in 1898. It is found in Brazil.

References

Euchromiina
Moths described in 1898